Losse may refer to:

People
 Losse (surname)

Places
 Losse, Saxony-Anhalt, a municipality in the district of Stendal, Germany
 Château de Losse, an historical site in the Périgord, Dordogne district of South-West of France
 Losse, Landes, a commune in Aquitaine, France
 Losse (Thouet), a principal tributary of the River Thouet 
 Losse (river), runs through Kaufungen in Hesse, Germany